Streptomyces chrestomyceticus is a bacterium species from the genus of Streptomyces. Streptomyces chrestomyceticus produces lycopene, pyrrolostatin, paromomycin, aminocidin, aminosidin, neomycin E and neomycin F.

Further reading

See also 
 List of Streptomyces species

References

External links
Type strain of Streptomyces chrestomyceticus at BacDive -  the Bacterial Diversity Metadatabase

chrestomyceticus
Bacteria described in 1959